Epimelitta ornaticollis is a species of beetle in the family Cerambycidae. It was described by Zajciw in 1973.

References

Epimelitta
Beetles described in 1973